A Wonderful Life is the second English-language album by pop singer Lara Fabian. It was released in June 2004.  In France, the album sold an estimated 82,000 copies.  "A Wonderful Life" was Fabian's last album under her contract with Sony Records and she subsequently left the company.

The album consists mostly of acoustic-influenced pop tracks.  Fabian had been offered and turned down, the track "Review My Kisses" before it was recorded by US country music star LeAnn Rimes for her 2002 album "Twisted Angel".  However Fabian was so impressed with Rimes' performance that she decided to record it herself.

Track listing

Charts

Release history

References

2004 albums
Lara Fabian albums